The Medal for Sacrifice and Courage is a Polish medal established on February 17, 1960. It is awarded to those who, with disregard for their own life, save people from drowning, aid the victims of natural disasters, fires, explosions, or other unfortunate circumstances, or protect the property of others during such events. The medal was designed in 1960 by Józef Gosławski.

References

External links 
 

Orders, decorations, and medals of Poland
Works by Józef Gosławski
Awards established in 1960